The Nimba Range forms part of the southern extent of the Guinea Highlands. "Mount Nimba" may refer either to Mount Richard-Molard or to the entire range. Mount Nimba Strict Nature Reserve of Guinea and Côte d'Ivoire covers significant portions of the Nimba Range.

Geology
The Nimba Range is a narrow ridge extending approximately 40 km long, with an orientation of northeast–southwest. It is composed mostly of Precambrian rock, including granite and quartzite which contain deposits of iron ore. Mining of top-quality iron-ore poses the major threat to the unique geomorphology and wildlife. There are about fifty springs, including the origins of the Cavally, Cestos, and Sassandra Rivers.

Climate
Rainfall varies greatly with elevation and season. About 3,000 mm of rain falls at the highest altitudes, and between 700 and 1,200 mm at the lower elevations. In fact, some parts of the mountain receive less precipitation, due to rain-shadow effect of the high ridge. Most of the rainfall occurs between May and October.

Ecology

The Nimba Range harbours an especially rich flora and fauna, and it is the home of more than 2000 vascular plant species, 317 vertebrate species, 107 of which are mammals, and to more than 2,500 invertebrate species. Notably endemic vertebrates are Nimba viviparous toad (Nimbaphrynoides occidentalis), Lamotte's roundleaf bat (Hipposideros lamottei), Myotis nimbaensis, and Nimba otter shrew (Micropotamogale lamottei). Other rare and endangered animals are West African lion (Panthera leo senegalensis), pygmy hippopotamus (Choeropsis liberiensis), zebra duiker (Cephalophus zebra), and western chimpanzee (Pan troglodytes verus) that uses stones as tools.

Terrestrial ecoregions include Western Guinean lowland forest, Guinean montane forest, Guinean forest-savanna mosaic, and West Sudanian savanna. The Nimba Range is a part of a distinct freshwater ecoregion with a high portion of endemic aquatic species.

Terrestrial
The plant communities vary with altitude and cardinal orientation.

The Guinean montane forests ecoregion covers the portion of the range above 600 meters elevation. Major plant communities in the ecoregion include montane grasslands and savannas, cloud forests, and lower montane forests. High-altitude grasslands and montane savannas cover the highest peaks, dominated by the grass Loudetia kagerensis. The grasslands are home to one endemic fern, Asplenium schnellii, and two endemic flowering plants, Osbeckia porteresii and Blaeria nimbana. Shrubs, including Protea occidentalis, inhabit the slopes.  The endemic frog species Nimbaphrynoides occidentalis, which inhabits the montane grasslands of the range, is totally viviparous. The Guinea Screeching Frog (Arthroleptis crusculum) is a threatened species found on Mt. Nimba and other peaks in the Guinea Highlands. It is found in high-altitude grassland and in gallery forests during the dry season. Ptychadena submascareniensis is another frog species that has been found only on Mount Nimba and in the Loma Mountains of Sierra Leone. Below the highest peaks, montane grasslands interspersed by gallery forests, between 1,200 and 1,400 meters. Above 900 meters elevation, near-daily mist and clouds support cloud forests, dominated by the Guinea Plum tree (Parinari excelsa), trees of the Myrtle family (Myrtaceae), including Syzygium guineense, and species of Ochna and Gaertnera. The moist climate supports many epiphytes, including an endemic orchid, Rhipidoglossum paucifolium. Lower montane forests of Lophira procera, Tarrietia utilis, Mapania spp., Chlorophora regia, Morus mesozygia, and Terminalia ivorensis occur between 600 and 900 meters elevation.

Below 600 meters, the montane forests transition to the Western Guinean lowland forests ecoregion.

The mountain is surrounded by Guinean forest-savanna mosaic, and West Sudanian savanna.

Freshwater
Swift-running streams descend steep slopes of the range, and often experience torrential floods during the rainy season. Rheophytes, plants that can live in running water, dominate the aquatic vegetation.

The endemic aquatic animals in the Nimba Range includes frogs, fish, the Nimba Stream Crab (Liberonautes nimba), and the endangered Nimba otter shrew (Micropotamogale lamottei). The African clawless otter (Aonyx capensis) also inhabits the mountain streams. Species richness is high among aquatic invertebrates, including 81 species of dragonflies.

The WWF designates the Nimba Range a distinct freshwater ecoregion because of its moderate species richness and high proportion of endemic aquatic species, particularly among fish and amphibians. The Nimba Range's high elevation, its rapids and waterfalls that isolate habitat areas, and the stability of the aquatic environment, have promoted speciation.

The Guinean Highlands, of which the Nimba Range are part, separate the coastal rivers and streams of Upper Guinea from the upper Niger River basin. The highlands form a barrier to movement of aquatic species between these freshwater regions. The fish fauna of the Nimba Range shares affinities with that of Upper Guinea.

Mount Nimba Strict Nature Reserve

In 1943, the colonial government established a Strict Nature Reserve in the Côte d'Ivoire section of the range. It was extended into Guinea the following year. The area remained protected after Guinea and Côte d'Ivoire became independent. UNESCO declared Mount Nimba a biosphere reserve in 1980, and a World Heritage Site shortly thereafter.

References

External links
 Mount Nimba (Freshwater Ecoregions of the World)
 Guinean Montane Forests (Encyclopedia of Earth)
 Western Guinean lowland forests (Encyclopedia of Earth)
 Guinean forest-savanna mosaic (Encyclopedia of Earth)
 Mount Nimba Strict Nature Reserve, Guinea and Côte d'Ivoire (Encyclopedia of Earth)
 Mount Nimba Strict Nature Reserve, Guinea and Côte d'Ivoire (UNESCO)
 Mount Nimba Strict Nature Reserve, Guinea and Côte d'Ivoire (UNESCO MAB Biosphere Reserves Directory)
 Mount Nimba Strict Nature Reserve, Guinea and Côte d'Ivoire (African World Heritage Sites)

Afromontane
Ecoregions of Guinea
Ecoregions of Ivory Coast
Ecoregions of Liberia
Freshwater ecoregions of Africa
Guinean montane forests
Mountain ranges of Guinea
Mountain ranges of Ivory Coast
Mountain ranges of Liberia
Montagnes District